Banaveylah-e Hajji Mineh (also Romanized as Banāveylah-e Ḩājjī Mīneh; also known as Banāveylah) is a village in Gavork-e Sardasht Rural District, in the Central District of Sardasht County, West Azerbaijan Province, Iran. At the 2006 census, its population was 102, in 19 families.

References 

Populated places in Sardasht County